The Dutchtown Formation is a geologic formation in Missouri. It preserves fossils dating back to the Ordovician period.

See also
 List of fossiliferous stratigraphic units in Missouri
 Paleontology in Missouri

References

 

Ordovician Missouri
Ordovician southern paleotemperate deposits